The Lubudi River is a tributary of the Lualaba River in the Democratic Republic of the Congo (DRC).
The Lubudi rises near the Zambian border southwest of Kolwezi. It flows north and northeast to join the Lualaba from the left where the southern Katanga plateau drops into the Upemba Depression, near Bukama.

History

Around 1800 the copper mines on the Lubudi river were part of the Lunda Empire. The people delivered copper to the Emperor ("Mwant Yav") as tribute, but also sold copper bars in exchange for food such as dried fish and manioc flour.
In the early nineteenth century the villagers on the upper Lubudi were subject to the Mushima chief, an ally of the king of Samba.

References

Sources

Lualaba River
Rivers of the Democratic Republic of the Congo